Erromenus is a genus of parasitoid wasps belonging to the family Ichneumonidae.

The species of this genus are found in Europe and Northern America.

Species:
 Erromenus acutus Townes & Gupta, 1992 
 Erromenus alpestrator Aubert, 1969

References

Ichneumonidae
Ichneumonidae genera